Simlak is a village in Jalalpore Taluka Navsari district, Gujarat, India.

As of the 2011 census it had a population of 1388; 694 males and 694 are females, giving a sex ration of exactly 1000, compared to the state average of 919. There were 184 children aged 0–6  (13.26% of the total) with a Child Sex Ratio of 1115, considerably  higher than the state average of 890. In 2011 the literacy rate was 79.65%; males 80.07% and females 79.23%.

The village has a school and a masjid. The school was built with the aid of foreign donors. The Simlak Muslim Association of South Africa raised funds to build the School and Masjid.

References

Villages in Navsari district